Richard Pearson Strong (1872–1948) was a tropical medicine professor at Harvard who did significant work in plague, cholera, bacillary dysentery and other diseases. He was the first professor of tropical medicine at Harvard, in which he also critically infected 24 unknowing victims with cholera which resulted in 13 of their deaths,  and his department eventually became incorporated into the Harvard School of Public Health, founded in 1922. From 1926 to 1927 he led the Harvard Medical African Expedition and authored the book The African Republic of Liberia and the Belgian Congo: Based on the Observations Made and Material Collected during the Harvard African Expedition, 1926-1927 in a partnership with other Expedition members and Harvard officials.

Biography 
Richard P. Strong was born in Fort Monroe, Virginia on March 18, 1872. He was educated at the Hopkins School, graduated from Yale University in 1893, and earned his medical degree at Johns Hopkins University in 1897.

He married Agnes Leas on January 1, 1916.

He died in Boston on July 4, 1948.

Bilibid vaccine trials 
Strong, while the head of the Bureau of Laboratories in Manila, carried out vaccine trials at the Philippine Bilibid Prison. During one of the experimental trials in 1906, twenty-four prisoners were injected, without their consent, with a cholera vaccine that was contaminated with bubonic plague. The prisoners became ill with bubonic plague and 13 died.

Sources 

  Harvard Public Health Alumni Bulletin,  November 1948, pp. 43–44.
  "Deaths".  JAMA 1948; 138 (4)
 Richard P. Strong Papers at the Countway repository of the Harvard Medical School — Includes images of R.P. Strong: 1924 on Amazon, c.1930s in Serbia, 1934 with the Harvard African Expedition

External links

 Richard P. Strong Papers, 1911-2004 (inclusive), 1911-1945 (bulk). GA 82. Harvard Medical Library, Francis A. Countway Library of Medicine, Boston, Mass.

American tropical physicians
1872 births
1948 deaths
Hopkins School alumni
Johns Hopkins School of Medicine alumni
Yale University alumni
Presidents of the American Society of Parasitologists